W29CI-D, virtual and UHF digital channel 29, is a low-power, Class A television station licensed to Salem, Illinois, United States. The station is owned by Innovate Corp.

History

The station's construction permit was issued on May 28, 1987 under the callsign of W28AI and changed to W29CI on September 28, 1998. It changed to the current callsign W29CI-D on January 7, 2013.

The station was owned by 3ABN until 2017, when it was included in a $9.6 million sale of 14 stations to Innovate Corp.

Subchannels
The station's digital signal is multiplexed:

References

External links

Television channels and stations established in 1989
Innovate Corp.
1989 establishments in Missouri
29CI-D
Low-power television stations in the United States
Classic Reruns TV affiliates